Knut Liestøl (13 November 1881 – 26 June 1952) was a Norwegian folklorist, Nynorsk proponent and politician.

He was born in Åseral as a son of farmers Olav Knutson Liestøl (1855–1944) and Sigrid Røynelid (1856–1950). He was a nephew of Lars Liestøl. In July 1913 he married farmers' daughter Signe Høgetveit. Their son Olav became a noted glaciologist.

A folklorist by profession, he took the dr.philos. degree in 1915 with the thesis Norske trollvisor og norrøne sogor. He was appointed as a docent in Nynorsk at the Royal Frederick University in 1909 and promoted to professor of folkloristics in 1917. He also served in Mowinckel's Third Cabinet as Minister of Education and Church Affairs 1933 to 1935. He was also the chairman of Noregs Mållag from 1925 to 1926.

Liestøl was a fellow of the Norwegian Academy of Science and Letters from 1916 and graduated as a Knight, Grand Cross of the Order of the Falcon and the Order of the Three Stars. He resided at Ramstad. He died in June 1952 in Bærum.

References

External links
 

1881 births
1952 deaths
People from Åseral
Norwegian folklorists
Academic staff of the University of Oslo
Government ministers of Norway
Liberal Party (Norway) politicians
Noregs Mållag
Members of the Norwegian Academy of Science and Letters
Knights Grand Cross of the Order of the Falcon
Ministers of Education of Norway